Jessie's Critter Carousel is a carousel at Disney California Adventure at the Disneyland Resort in Anaheim, California. The attraction  opened to the public as King Triton's Carousel of the Sea on February 8, 2001.

King Triton's Carousel was closed on March 5, 2018. It was re-themed to Jessie's Critter Carousel, inspired by Disney·Pixar's Toy Story 2, and officially reopened April 5, 2019.

Additional information
When the attraction was themed to King Triton's Carousel, several plaques inside the ride displayed the names and opening years for boardwalks and piers around California's coastline, including:
 Abbot Kinney Pier, Venice (1905)
 Venice of America, Venice (1904)
 Fraser's "Million Dollar" Pier, Ocean Park (1912)
 Pickering Pleasure Pier, Ocean Park (1920)
 Lick Pier, Ocean Park (1923)
 Venice Pier, Venice (1925)
 Ocean Park Pier, Ocean Park (1929)
 Looff's Pier, Santa Monica (1908)
 Santa Monica Pier, Santa Monica (1909)
 Pacific Ocean Park, Santa Monica (1958)
 The Pike, Long Beach (1905)
 Nu Pike, Long Beach (1950)
 Virginia Park, Long Beach (1939)
 Belmont Park, San Diego (1925)
 Santa Cruz Beach Boardwalk, Santa Cruz (1907)
 Playland At The Beach, San Francisco (1928)

References

External links
 

Operating amusement attractions
Disney California Adventure
Paradise Pier
Pixar Pier
Pixar in amusement parks
Amusement rides introduced in 2001
Amusement rides that closed in 2018
Amusement rides introduced in 2019
Toy Story
Amusement rides manufactured by D. H. Morgan Manufacturing
2001 establishments in California
2019 establishments in California